Crime is present in various forms in the Philippines, and remains a serious issue throughout the country. Illegal drug trade, human trafficking, arms trafficking, murder, corruption and domestic violence remain significant concerns. Many major cities are plagued with the prevalence of crimes.

Crime by type

Murder
In 2014, the Philippines had a murder rate of 9.84 per 100,000 people, with a number of 9,784 recorded cases. The country also has the highest rate of murder cases in Southeast Asia in 2013, with a rate of 8.8, followed by Thailand. The murder rate in the Philippines reached its peak in 2002 and 2010, with rates of 8.1 (6,553 cases) and 9.5 (8,894 cases).

Organized crime  
Organized crime in the Philippines can be linked to certain families or barkadas (groups) who perpetrate crimes ranging from extortion, sale of illegal narcotics and loan sharking to robbery, kidnapping, and murder-for-hire.

Illegal drug trade

Illegal drug trade is a major concern in the Philippines. Meth ("shabu") and marijuana ("weeds" or "damo"), are the most common drugs accounting most drug-related arrests. Most of the illegal drug trade involved members of large Chinese triad groups operating in the Philippines, owing to its location on drug smuggling routes.

Petty crime
Petty crime, which includes pick-pocketing, is a problem in the Philippines. It takes place usually in locations with many people, ranging from shopping hubs to churches. Traveling alone to withdraw cash after dark is a risk, especially for foreigners.

Rape

Domestic violence

Human trafficking

Human trafficking and the prostitution of children is a significant issue in the Philippines, often controlled by organized crime syndicates.
Human trafficking in the country is a crime against humanity.

In an effort to deal with the problem, the Philippines passed Republic Act (R.A.) 9208, the Anti-Trafficking in Persons Act of 2003, a penal law against human trafficking, sex tourism, sex slavery and child prostitution. Nevertheless, enforcement is reported to be inconsistent.

Prostitution

Prostitution in the Philippines is illegal. It is a serious crime with penalties ranging up to life imprisonment for those involved in trafficking. It is covered by the Anti-Trafficking in Persons Act. Prostitution is still sometimes illegally available through brothels (also known as casa), bars, karaoke bars, massage parlors, street walkers and escort services. , one source estimates that there are 800,000 women working as prostitutes in the Philippines, with some of them believed to be underage. While victims are largely female, and according to the current Revised Penal Code, there are in fact a small minority of them who are male.

Corruption and police misconduct

Corruption is a major problem in the Philippines. In 2013, during the country's elections, some 504 political candidates were accused mostly of corruption and some of violent crimes.

See also
 List of gangs in the Philippines

References